Ihar Burko (born 8 September 1988) is a Belarusian professional football player who plays for Torpedo-BelAZ Zhodino.

International career
Burko was called up to the senior Belarus squad for a UEFA Euro 2016 qualifier against Macedonia in October 2015.

Honours
Torpedo-BelAZ Zhodino
Belarusian Cup winner: 2015–16

Shakhtyor Soligorsk
Belarusian Premier League champion: 2020
Belarusian Cup winner: 2018–19

References

External links

1988 births
Living people
Belarusian footballers
Belarus international footballers
Association football defenders
FC Smolevichi players
FC Dynamo Brest players
FC Torpedo-BelAZ Zhodino players
FC Shakhtyor Soligorsk players